Amba Aradam is a table mountain in northern Ethiopia.

The name in Tigrinya is Imba Aradom, but international usage in geology (Amba Aradam Formation) and history (battles in the 1930s) have coined the name Amba Aradam.

Geology
)
The outcropping bedrock consists of Jurassic,  sub-horizontally layered or slightly inclined, marine varicoloured marls and marly clays with interbedded limestones, sandstones and gypsum layers, that are part of the Agula Shales Formation. These are unconformably overlain  by  Cretaceous  continental  conglomerates,  sandstones  and  laterite  levels, belonging to the Amba Aradam Formation, which is obviously named after the mountain.  The unconformity is due to a planation episode which followed the pre-Cretaceous marine regression. Dolerite sills and laccolites of Oligocene age are interlayered within the Agula Shales.  Small dolerite necks are exposed on the westernmost edge of the upper escarpment and west of the Amba Aradam summit.

Vegetation
The present-day spontaneous vegetation is dominated by Juniperus procera, Eucalyptus camaldulensis and Podocarpus gracilior, although farming and grazing have reduced it to a sparse shrub cover, except for limited areas around churches where the holy character of the places allows their preservation.

Settlements
Human settlements are scattered around the main relief, being usually located on the most favourable  topographic situations,  such  as  flat  surfaces  and  foot  slopes,  where  colluvial deposits allow subsistence farming.
Major town on the foot of the mountain is Hintalo, which used to be capital of Tigray in the 19th century, after which large parts of the town were abandoned. Ruins of the abandoned quarters were observed in 1868 and are still present nowadays.

History
The mount is famous for the Battle of Enderta that the Italians fought in order to capture Amba Aradam on 15 February 1936, and for the massacre three years later, as an action against the Arbegnoch, or Ethiopian partisans.

Between 9–11 April 1939, a group of Arbegnoch, led by Abebe Aregai, had taken refuge in the Amezena Washa (Cavern of the Rebels), which was in Amba Aradam. The party included members of the Arbegnoch, but also their relatives, wounded, and other refugee non-combatants.

On 9 April 1939, the chemical platoon of the Granatieri di Savoia Division attacked the Arbegnoch using bombs with poison gas, killing most of those inside. Only fifteen persons succeeded in escaping from the cave. Those who continued the resistance inside the cave were killed with flamethrowers. The extent of the cave made it difficult to explore for the remaining members of the resistance who were still within, so the Italian military command gave the order to seal it with explosives:

References

Mountains of Ethiopia
Tigray Region